Peljor is a Bhutanese surname. Notable people with this surname include:

 Tashi Peljor (born 1978), Bhutanese archer
 Umze Peljor (died 1707), 7th head of government of Bhutan

Surnames of Asian origin